The 1916 West Cork by-election was held on 15 November 1916.  The by-election was held due to the death of the incumbent All-for-Ireland League MP, James Gilhooly.  It was won by the Irish Parliamentary Party candidate Daniel O'Leary.

During World War I the major political parties observed an electoral truce and most elections were uncontested with the incumbent party nominating a successor who was returned unopposed. Unusually, when Gilhooly died, the seat was contested by three candidates none of whom had official recognition from the Irish Nationalist political organisations but all of whom supported the broad Nationalist agenda. The by-election has its place in history as the first after the Easter Rising, the last in which the Irish Parliamentary Party captured a seat, the effective self-inflicted demise of the All-for-Ireland League and, in general, a pivotal point in the transition from one era to another. It was also the last great clash between the political rivals William O'Brien's All-for-Ireland League and John Redmond's Irish Parliamentary Party.

Result

1 O'Leary had pledged to join the Irish Parliamentary Party and was a supporter of John Redmond. However, the official Nationalists' organisation (the United Irish League) had withheld approval of his candidacy.

2 Healy was imprisoned in Frongoch internment camp for supposedly being associated with Sinn Féin, but Sinn Féin repudiated his candidacy for not revoking to take his seat at Westminster, instead had been supported by William O'Brien, who was leader of the All-for-Ireland League.

3 Shipsey was a local member of the All-for-Ireland League who stood in protest against William O'Brien's adoption of an unofficial candidate.

The 1916 by-election, which contrasted so obviously with Gilhooly's long tenure of the seat, was viewed as a farce by Unionist opinion.

References

1916 elections in Ireland
1916 elections in the United Kingdom
By-elections to the Parliament of the United Kingdom in County Cork constituencies